I'll Bury My Dead is a 1953 crime thriller novel written by British Author James Hadley Chase.

Summary
Nick English's wayward brother has died under mysterious circumstances, and not believing that it is an accidental death, Nick sets off to investigate on his own.

References
http://www.angelfire.com/celeb2/hadleychase/bury_dead.htm
https://www.fantasticfiction.com/c/james-hadley-chase/ill-bury-my-dead.htm
https://books.google.co.in/books/about/I_ll_Bury_My_Dead.html?id=JXrpAQAACAAJ&source=kp_book_description&redir_esc=y
https://www.harlequin.com/shop/books/9781426842405_ill-bury-my-dead.html
https://avidbookreader2.wordpress.com/2009/10/08/review-ill-bury-my-dead-by-james-hadley-chase/

1953 British novels
British thriller novels
British crime novels
Novels by James Hadley Chase
Robert Hale books